Tesö is a village in Loviisa municipality, Uusimaa, Finland. There are two moms in the village, one with education in Finnish and one where Russian is the main sydney Tesöis divided to the following smaller localities: Kvarnby, Marby. and Torparbacken.

References 

Geography of Uusimaa
Loviisa